James St Clair-Erskine, 2nd Earl of Rosslyn,  (6 February 1762 – 18 January 1837), known as Sir James Erskine, Bt, between 1765 and 1789 and as Sir James St Clair-Erskine, Bt, between 1789 and 1805, was a Scottish soldier, politician, slave holder, and Acting Grand Master of the Grand Lodge of Scotland, on behalf of King George IV.

Background and education

Erskine was the son of Lieutenant-General Sir Henry Erskine, 5th Baronet, and Janet, daughter of Peter Wedderburn (a Lord of Session under the judicial title of Lord Chesterhall) and sister of Alexander Wedderburn, 1st Earl of Rosslyn. Lord Rosslyn's earldom had been created with special remainder to his nephew, Erskine. Erskine succeeded as sixth baronet in 1765, at the age of three, on the death of his father. He was educated at Edinburgh High School and Eton, and was commissioned in the 21st Light Dragoons in 1778.

Military career
Erskine was assistant Adjutant-General in Ireland in 1782. In 1793, he became Adjutant-General, in which capacity he served at the Siege of Toulon and Corsica. In 1795, he was promoted to colonel and appointed Aide-de-Camp to King George III. He became a major-general in 1798, lieutenant-general in 1805, and general in 1814. In 1806, he was a member of the special mission to Lisbon, which resulted in Sir Arthur Wellesley (later the Duke of Wellington) being sent to the Peninsular. He also saw action in Denmark

Slave holder
Rosslyn was associated with "Antigua no. 79 T71/877 claim by Bethell Walrond", he owned 233 slaves in Antigua and received a £3,626 payment at the time (worth £ in ).

Political career
Erskine was a member of the House of Commons for the English pocket boroughs of Castle Rising between 1782 and 1784 and Morpeth between 1784 and 1796. Initially a Whig, an adherent of Edmund Burke and an active supporter of Charles James Fox against William Pitt the Younger in the debates over the East India Company, he was one of the managers of the Impeachment of Warren Hastings. In 1789, on inheriting the Rosslyn and Dysart estates from his cousin James Paterson St Clair, he adopted the name St Clair before his own surname. In 1796, he was elected for the Dysart Burghs in Fife, a constituency traditionally under the St Clair influence.

In January 1805, he succeeded his uncle as Earl of Rosslyn according to the special remainder, being by this time considered a Tory, and, after the end of the Napoleonic Wars, continued his political career in the House of Lords. He was a member of the cabinet as Lord Privy Seal from 1829 to 1830 under the Duke of Wellington's and Lord President of the Council under Sir Robert Peel from 1834 to 1835. In 1829, he was sworn of the Privy Council.

Family
Lord Rosslyn married Harriet Elizabeth, daughter of the Hon. Edward Bouverie, in 1790. She died in August 1810. Rosslyn remained a widower until his death in January 1837, aged 74. He was succeeded by his son, James.

References

 Military service
Robert Beatson, A Chronological Register of Both Houses of Parliament (London: Longman, Hurst, Res & Orme, 1807) 
 Concise Dictionary of National Biography (1930)
 Lewis Namier & John Brooke, The History of Parliament: The House of Commons 1754-1790 (London: HMSO, 1964)

External links

Rosslyn, James Saint Clair-Erskine, 2nd Earl of
Rosslyn, James Saint Clair-Erskine, 2nd Earl of
Rosslyn, James Saint Clair-Erskine, 2nd Earl of
Lord Presidents of the Council
Rosslyn, James Saint Clair-Erskine, 2nd Earl of
Members of the Privy Council of the United Kingdom
Saint Clair-Erskine, James
Members of the Parliament of Great Britain for English constituencies
British MPs 1780–1784
British MPs 1784–1790
British MPs 1790–1796
British MPs 1796–1800
James
Saint Clair-Erskine, James
Saint Clair-Erskine, James
Saint Clair-Erskine, James
Saint Clair-Erskine, James
Rosslyn, E2
Rosslyn, James Saint Clair-Erskine, 2nd Earl of
Rosslyn, James Saint Clair-Erskine, 2nd Earl of
Rosslyn, James Saint Clair-Erskine, 2nd Earl of
Knights Grand Cross of the Order of the Bath
Rosslyn, James Saint Clair-Erskine, 2nd Earl of
British Army personnel of the Napoleonic Wars
British Army personnel of the French Revolutionary Wars
14th King's Hussars officers
8th King's Royal Irish Hussars officers
12th Royal Lancers officers
Ambassadors of the United Kingdom to Portugal
Recipients of payments from the Slavery Abolition Act 1833
Scottish slave owners
People educated at Eton College